Karvirala is a village and Gram panchayat of Thungaturthy mandal, Suryapet district, in Telangana state.

References

Villages in Suryapet district